Ashe Windham (17 February 1673 – 4 April 1749), of Felbrigg, Norfolk,  was an English landowner and politician who sat in the House of Commons from 1708 to 1710.

Life

Windham was the eldest son of William Windham of Felbrigg (died 1689) and his wife Katherine Ashe, daughter of Sir Joseph Ashe, 1st Baronet of Twickenham. His maternal uncle was Sir James Ashe, 2nd Baronet and his brothers were William Windham and Joseph Windham Ashe. The Windham family had had a seat at Felbrigg Hall since the mid-15th century. Whilst at Eton College he succeeded his father in 1689. After attending King's College, Cambridge, he took a grand tour round Italy between 1693 and 1696.

In 1708, he was due to marry Hester Buckworth, but she died, and a year later, in summer 1709, he married a wealthy heiress, Elizabeth Dobyns, the daughter and heir of William Dobyns of Lincoln's Inn.

Parliamentary career
Windham was first considered as a parliamentary candidate in 1699, for Norfolk (his father had unsuccessfully run for it in 1679 as a Whig). However, according to Humphrey Prideaux, his grand tour counted against him:

Windham  stepped down from the 1705 election campaign in favour of his friend and cousin Roger Townshend, whom he replaced at the 1708 British general election, contesting the seat unopposed and becoming the first of his family to sit in Parliament. That year he was said to possess "as great estate as any commoner in the country".

Windham was one of the main MPs behind an unsuccessful address to Queen Anne on 25 January 1709 requesting that she remarry. He and Robert Walpole II stood for Norfolk at the 1710 British general election but were defeated and he declined to stand again in 1713.

Later life and legacy
Windham's  marriage failed, and after the birth of a son in 1717, the couple parted. He retired  to Felbrigg to manage his estates and look after the education of his son. He also had one illegitimate daughter.

A portrait of Windham by Sir Godfrey Kneller is owned by the National Trust and held at Felbrigg.

References

1673 births
1749 deaths
Members of the Parliament of Great Britain for Norfolk
British MPs 1708–1710
People from Felbrigg